The Jew of New York is a graphic novel by Ben Katchor, inspired by Mordecai Manuel Noah's attempt to establish a Jewish homeland in Grand Island, New York in the 1820s. It was originally serialized in the pages of The Jewish Daily Forward before being published in book form in 1999.

References

External links
New York Times review by J. Hoberman
Village Voice review
City Pages review
Entertainment Weekly review

Pantheon Books comics titles
1999 graphic novels
Jewish American novels
Jews and Judaism in New York (state)
Novels first published in serial form
Works originally published in The Forward
Comics by Ben Katchor
Pantheon Books graphic novels
Novels set in the 1830s
Novels set in New York (state)
Comics set in New York (state)
Erie County, New York
Jewish-related comics